Susie Hamilton is an English artist.

Hamilton born 10 August 1950 studied painting at St Martins School of Art and Byam Shaw School of Art in London (now Central St. Martins, University of the Arts London) before reading English Literature at Birkbeck, University of London where she gained a Ph.D in 1989. Her paintings are held in public and private collections which include Murderme (the art collection of Damien Hirst), The Priseman Seabrook Collection, The Deutsche Bank Art Collection, The Economist, The Bernard Jacobson Collection, Groucho Club, New Hall Art Collection University of Cambridge and The Methodist Modern Art Collection, London. In 2015 Hamilton was artist-in-residence at St. Paul's Cathedral, London.

Hamilton has been called a "flâneur" since she observes from the sidelines, scrutinising tourists, shoppers, holidaymakers, diners, hen nights and other scenes of leisure. She has to work extremely quickly to catch particular movements and poses and this means that her figures are compressed, abbreviated and simplified and usually morph into something misshapen and grotesque. Of her work Hamilton has said "I often wanted to paint joy (as well as its opposite)."

Selected solo exhibitions 
 "In Atoms", Paul Stopler, London (2016)
 "Shoppers" The House of St Barnabas, London (2015)
 "A New Heaven and a New Earth" St Giles Cripplegate (2011)
 "Madly Singing in the Mountains" Paul Stolper, London (2009)
 "World of Light" Triumph Gallery, Moscow (2008)
 "Paintings and Monoprints" Galleri Trafo, Oslo (2007)
 "Leisure Paintings" Paul Stolper, London (2006)
 "Immense Dawn" Paul Stolper, London (2004)
 "Paradise Alone" Ferens Art Gallery, Hull (2002)

Selected group exhibitions 
 "Contemporary Masters from Britain: 80 British Painters of the 21st Century", Tianjin Academy of Fine Arts Museum, China, Jiangsu Art Gallery, Nanjing, China, Jiangsu Museum of Arts and Crafts (Artall), Nanjing, China, Yantai Art Museum, China (2017/18)
 "The Art of Mary", Southwell Minster, Nottinghamshire (2016)
 "Contemporary British Watercolours" Burton Art Gallery & Museum, Bideford, Devon (2016)
 "The John Ruskin Prize - Recording Britain Now: Society" The New Art Gallery Walsall, Walsall (2016)
 "The Names" Transition Gallery, London (2016) 
 "Contemporary British Watercolours" Maidstone Museum & Bentlif Art Gallery, Maidstone, Kent (2015)
 "Drawing Biennial 2015" The Drawing Room, London (2015)
 "Material Tension" Collyer Bristow Gallery, London (2015)
 "Brentwood Stations of The Cross" Brentwood Cathedral (2015)
 "Contemporary British Painting" Huddersfield Art Gallery (2014)
 "Susie Hamilton/Georgia Hayes/Mit Senoj" Paul Stolper Gallery, London (2014)
 "Winter Salon" Lloyds Club, London (2013)
 "Time Will Come" Factory-Art - Berlin, Berlin (2012)
 "Vacant Lots" WW Gallery, London (2012)
 "Threadneedle Prize" Mall Galleries, London (2012)
 "Jerwood Drawing Prize" Jerwood Space, London (2012)
 "In The Flesh" Paul Stolper Gallery, London (2011)
 "Seconds Issue 12: Archetype: Going Underground / The Cruel Scene Of The Image" Event, London (2010)
 "Keep me posted" Posted, London (2010)
 "Drink & Dial" WW Gallery, London (2010)
 "Summer Exhibition" Royal Academy of Arts, London (2009)
 "Strictly Painting - The Right Side of Painting" National Suisse Hochhaus, Frankfurt/Main (2005)
 "John Moores 23" Walker Art Gallery Liverpool (2004)

Selected publications 
 "The Self in Speech", Garageland 19 (2017)
’On Margate Sands: Paintings and Drawings based on TS Eliot’s The Waste Land’
 "Nick Fudge and Susie Hamilton In Conversation", Turps Banana Magazine, Issue-18 (2017)
 "In Search of the Beautiful: The Art of Susie Hamilton" by Richard Davey, Image Journal (2016) 
 "Encyclopedia of Red" The Art Newspaper, ARTY 36 (2016)
 "Picturing People: The New State of the Art" by Charlotte Mullins (2015)

Selected collections 
 New Hall Art Collection, University of Cambridge
 The Priseman Seabrook Collection
 The Methodist Modern Art Collection, London

References

External links
 Susie Hamilton
 ArtFacts Susie Hamilton
 PDF of "Susie Hamilton in Conversation with Nick Fudge", Turps Banana Magazine, Issue 18, July 2017

1950 births
Living people
21st-century English painters
English women painters
21st-century British women artists
21st-century English women